The New Castle micropolitan area may refer to:

The New Castle, Pennsylvania micropolitan area, United States
The New Castle, Indiana micropolitan area, United States

See also
Newcastle (disambiguation)